Carlos Romero Serrano (born 29 October 2001) is a Spanish footballer who plays as a left back for Villarreal CF B.

Club career
Born in Valencia, Serrano was a CF Torre Levante youth graduate. He made his first team debut on 10 November 2018, coming on as a late substitute and being sent off in a 1–0 Tercera División home loss against Atzeneta UE.

On 24 May 2019, Romero signed for Villarreal CF, and was initially assigned to the youth sides. He was definitely promoted to the C-team also in the fourth tier in October 2020, and became an undisputed starter for the side during the 2021–22 season.

Ahead of the 2022–23 campaign, Romero was promoted to the reserves in Segunda División. He made his professional debut on 29 August 2022, replacing Dani Tasende late into a 3–0 away loss against Granada CF.

References

External links

2001 births
Living people
Spanish footballers
Footballers from Valencia (city)
Association football defenders
Segunda División players
Tercera División players
Tercera Federación players
CF Torre Levante players
Villarreal CF C players
Villarreal CF B players